Tritia reticulata, common name the "netted dog whelk", is a species of small European sea snail, a marine gastropod mollusc in the family Nassariidae, the dog whelks or nassa mud snails.

Description

The length of the shell varies between 20 mm and 35 mm.

The egg-shaped shell is elongated, rounded, obtuse at its lower extremity, and pointed at the upper extremity. It is moderately thick. The conical spire is composed of eight or nine whorls, almost flat, or slightly swollen, but distant from each other. Their surface is deeply chequered by longitudinal folds, crossed by numerous striae. The aperture is moderate, white and ovate. The outer lip is thick, ornamented within with seven or eight striae, of which those of the middle are generally the largest. The columella is slightly arcuated, covered with a thin, brilliant plate. The color of this shell is of a yellowish white, reddish or chestnut-color, with a blackish blue band, passing beneath the suture.

Distribution
This species occurs in the Northeast Atlantic, in European waters, in the Atlantic Ocean off the Azores, the Canary Islands, Cape Verde Islands and Morocco.

References

 Pulteney, R. (1799). Catalogue of the birds, shells, and some of the more rare plants of Dorsetshire. London, Nichols, 92 pp.
 Cernohorsky W. O. (1984). Systematics of the family Nassariidae (Mollusca: Gastropoda). Bulletin of the Auckland Institute and Museum 14: 1-356.
 Hayward, P.J.; Ryland, J.S. (Ed.) (1990). The marine fauna of the British Isles and North-West Europe: 1. Introduction and protozoans to arthropods. Clarendon Press: Oxford, UK. . 627 pp.
 Howson, C.M.; Picton, B.E. (Ed.) (1997). The species directory of the marine fauna and flora of the British Isles and surrounding seas. Ulster Museum Publication, 276. The Ulster Museum: Belfast, UK. . vi, 508 (+ cd-rom) pp.
 Gofas, S.; Le Renard, J.; Bouchet, P. (2001). Mollusca, in: Costello, M.J. et al. (Ed.) (2001). European register of marine species: a check-list of the marine species in Europe and a bibliography of guides to their identification. Collection Patrimoines Naturels, 50: pp. 180–213
 Muller, Y. (2004). Faune et flore du littoral du Nord, du Pas-de-Calais et de la Belgique: inventaire. [Coastal fauna and flora of the Nord, Pas-de-Calais and Belgium: inventory]. Commission Régionale de Biologie Région Nord Pas-de-Calais: France. 307 pp.
 Rolán E., 2005. Malacological Fauna From The Cape Verde Archipelago. Part 1, Polyplacophora and Gastropoda.

External links 
 
 Image of live specimen
 Linnaeus, C. (1758). Systema Naturae per regna tria naturae, secundum classes, ordines, genera, species, cum characteribus, differentiis, synonymis, locis. Editio decima, reformata (10th revised edition) vol. 1: 824 pp. Laurentius Salvius: Holmiae
 Röding, P. F. (1798). Museum Boltenianum sive Catalogus cimeliorum e tribus regnis naturæ quæ olim collegerat Joa. Fried Bolten, M. D. p. d. per XL. annos proto physicus Hamburgensis. Pars secunda continens Conchylia sive Testacea univalvia, bivalvia & multivalvia. Trapp, Hamburg. viii, 199 pp
 Lamarck, (J.-B. M.) de. (1822). Histoire naturelle des animaux sans vertèbres. Tome septième. Paris: published by the Author, 711 pp
 Gmelin, J. F. (1791). Vermes. In: Gmelin J.F. (Ed.) Caroli a Linnaei Systema Naturae per Regna Tria Naturae, Ed. 13. Tome 1(6). G.E. Beer, Lipsiae
 Locard, A. (1886). Prodrome de malacologie française. Catalogue général des mollusques vivants de France. Mollusques marins. Lyon: H. Georg & Paris: Baillière. x + 778 pp.
 Martens, E. von. (1870). Ueber Nassa reticulata. Malakozoologische Blätter. 17: 86-88.
 Galindo L.A., Puillandre N., Utge J., Lozouet P. & Bouchet P. (2016). The phylogeny and systematics of the Nassariidae revisited (Gastropoda, Buccinoidea). Molecular Phylogenetics and Evolution. 99: 337-353.page(s): 343

reticulata
Gastropods described in 1758
Taxa named by Carl Linnaeus
Molluscs of the Atlantic Ocean
Molluscs of the Azores
Molluscs of the Canary Islands
Gastropods of Cape Verde
Invertebrates of North Africa